Arylomycin A2 is a synthetic antibiotic of the arylomycin class.

References

Polypeptide antibiotics